Madelaynne Montaño Caicedo (born January 6, 1983 in Tuluá, Valle del Cauca) is a volleyball player from Colombia, who won the silver medal at the 2012 FIVB Club World Championship playing with Rabita Baku.

Montaño won the South Korean V-League in the 2009/10 season with KT&G Daejeon and the 2012-13 Azerbaijan Super League playing with Rabita Baku. She won the Most Valuable Player award in both times.

Personal life
Madelaynne started playing basketball at school. She is married and has a son.

Career
After playing as junior, she played since 1996 in Colombian Liga del Valle. After the 1998 South American Junior Championship she was pretended by the Argentinian club Boca Juniors, but she signed with the Argentinian League club San Fernando de Catamarca for the 1998/99 season.

From Argentina she went to Miami Dade College. There she studied military psychology and played in the volleyball team from 2002 to 2003, winning the NJCAA National Championship in 2002, being chosen among the All-Tournament Team and also was the AVCA Two-year Colleges National Player of the Year award. For the 2003 season, the Miami Dade College team finished in 3rd place after falling in the semifinal game from Southwest Missouri State and beating the College of Southern Idaho for the Bronze medal match. In that tournament Madelaynne was awarded among the All-Tournament Team and Best Scorer, Best Spiker and Best Server. After playing in the Miami Dade College, she participated in the Volleyball Tournament of the 2004 National Games, winning the Silver Medal representing the Valle region.

Signed in Greece to play for two years in the Greek A1 League team Aris Thessaloniki. With this team she finished in third place for the 2004/2005 League Championship and second in the Greek Cup. After the 2005/2006 season, Madelaynne took sabbatical time due to maternity, coming back to play in the other Thessaloniki team, Iraklis Thessaloniki for the 2008/2009 A1 Season. In 2009 Montaño joined the South Korean club KT&G Daejeon, winning the 2009/2010 League Championship and the "Most Valuable Player" award.

2011
Playing with her South Korean club, KT&G Hungkuk, Madelaynne scored 53 points against GS Caltex from the South Korean V-League.

At the end of the 2010-2011 club season, Montaño finished in second place in the Most Valuable Player voting poll.

Alongside international player Kenny Moreno, Montaño accepted to play with the Colombia National team, to pursuit the team qualification for the 2012 Olympics.

For her achievements in the 2010/2011 season, Montaño was one of the finalists for the Colombian Sportswoman of the Year award, ultimately won by champion cyclist Mariana Pajón.

In her first official international tournament with her national team, Montaño finished 4th at the 2011 South American Championship and was awarded Best Scorer of the tournament.

2012
She signed for Rabita Baku to play the 2012/2013 season. Montaño won the silver medal in the 2012 FIVB Club World Championship, playing with the Azerbaijani club Rabita Baku.

2013
Montaño's club, Rabita Baku won the Azerbaijan Super League Championship winning their sixth title in a row. She won the league's Most Valuable Player award.

Soon after the end of the Azerbaijani Super League, Montaño signed with the Turkish club Galatasaray Daikin.

Montaño earn the Most Valuable Player of the South American Championship with the National Team, which ranked in 4th place and helping her team to qualify for the 2014 South American World Championship Qualification Tournament.

Clubs
  San Fernando de Catamarca (1998–1999)
  Aris Thessaloniki (2004–2006)
  Iraklis Thessaloniki (2008–2009)
  KT&G Daejeon (2009–2012)
  Rabita Baku (2012–2013)
  Galatasaray Daikin (2013–2014)
  Fenerbahçe Istanbul (2014–2015)
  Chemik Police (2015–2017)
  Aris Thessaloniki (2018-)

Awards

Individuals
 2009-10 South Korean V-League Regular Season "Most Valuable Player"
 2011 South American Championship "Best Scorer"
 2012 Summer Olympics South American qualification tournament "Best Scorer"
 2012-13 CEV Champions League "Best Scorer"
 2012-13 Azerbaijan Super League "Most Valuable Player"
 2013 South American Championship "Most Valuable Player"

College
 2002 - AVCA NJCAA Player of the Year
 2002 NJCAA National Championship All-Tournament Team
 2002 NJCAA National Championship
 2003 NJCAA National Championship Best Scorer
 2003 NJCAA National Championship Best Spiker
 2003 NJCAA National Championship Best Server
 2003 NJCAA National Championship All-Tournament Team

Clubs
 2008-09 Greek Cup - Runner-Up, with Iraklis Thessaloniki
 2009-10 South Korean V-League -  Champion, with KT&G Daejeon
 2012 FIVB Club World Championship -  Runner-Up, with Rabita Baku
 2012–13 CEV Champions League -  Runner-Up, with Rabita Baku
 2012-13 Azerbaijan Super League-  Champion, with Rabita Baku
 2014–15 Turkish Women's Volleyball League -  Champion, with Fenerbahçe Grundig Istanbul
 2016-17 Polish Volleyball League -  Champion, with KPS Chemik Police

References

External links

1983 births
Living people
Colombian women's volleyball players
Colombian expatriate sportspeople in Turkey
Miami Dade College alumni
Galatasaray S.K. (women's volleyball) players
Fenerbahçe volleyballers
Junior college women's volleyball players in the United States
Opposite hitters
Expatriate sportspeople in Argentina
Expatriate volleyball players in Greece
Expatriate volleyball players in South Korea
Expatriate volleyball players in Azerbaijan
Expatriate volleyball players in Turkey
Expatriate volleyball players in the United States
Expatriate volleyball players in Poland
Colombian expatriate sportspeople in Argentina
Colombian expatriate sportspeople in Greece
Colombian expatriates in South Korea
Colombian expatriate sportspeople in Poland
Sportspeople from Valle del Cauca Department
21st-century Colombian women